Girls of the Road is a 1940 American action film, based on an original screenplay by Robert Hardy Andrews, directed by Nick Grinde, and produced by Wallace MacDonald.

The main characters of the 61–minute Columbia Pictures feature film were ten female "hobos", portrayed by Ann Dvorak (Kay), Helen Mack (Mickey), Lola Lane (Ellie), Ann Doran (Jerry), Marjorie Cooley (Irene), Mary Field (Mae), Mary Booth (Edna), Madelon Grayson (Annie), Grace Lenard (Stella), and Evelyn Young (Sadie). Male actors in the films included Bruce Bennett (Officer Sullivan), Eddie Laughton (Footsy), and Don Beddoe (Sheriff).

References

External links
 
 Girls of the Road on Turner Classic Movies

1940 films
American action films
Films directed by Nick Grinde
1940s action films
American black-and-white films
1940s English-language films
1940s American films